The Hyatt Regency Toronto is a 394-room, 19-floor hotel in the Entertainment District of Toronto, Ontario. The hotel opened as a Holiday Inn in 1990 and has been operated by Hyatt since 2009.

History

The hotel opened in 1990, managed by Holiday Inn as the Holiday Inn on King. It was designed by architectural firm Darling & Downey and constructed by EllisDon. In 2009, the hotel was renovated and reopened on March 3, 2009 under the Hyatt Regency brand as the Hyatt Regency Toronto.

Toronto's first Hyatt Regency opened in 1972 at 21 Avenue Road in Yorkville. In 1978, the hotel was bought by Isadore Sharp and renamed the Four Seasons Hotel Toronto. In 1999, Hyatt purchased the Park Plaza Hotel for $107 million and it now operates under their top-tier Park Hyatt brand.

See also
 Hotels in Toronto
 Park Hyatt Toronto
 Four Seasons Hotel and Residences Toronto

References

External links
 

Hyatt Hotels and Resorts
Hotels in Toronto
Hotels established in 1990
Hotel buildings completed in 1990
1990 establishments in Ontario